Jussi Rintamäki (born 4 July 1935) is a Finnish sprinter. He competed in the men's 4 × 400 metres relay at the 1960 Summer Olympics.

References

1935 births
Living people
Athletes (track and field) at the 1960 Summer Olympics
Finnish male sprinters
Finnish male hurdlers
Olympic athletes of Finland
Place of birth missing (living people)